The following is a list of events that occurred in the year 1993 in Denmark.

Incumbents
 Monarch - Margrethe II
 Prime minister - Poul Schlüter (until January 25), Poul Nyrup Rasmussen

Events

Undated

The arts

Sports

Badminton
 Lillerød BK wins Europe Cup.
 1721 March  Jon Holst-Christensen and Thomas Lund win gold in men's double and Jon Holst-Christensen and Grete Mogensen win gold in mixed double at the 1993 All England Open Badminton Championships.
 31 May  6 June  Denmark wins one gold medal, one silver medal and two bronze medals at the 1993 IBF World Championships.

Cycling
 18 April — Rolf Sørensen wins the Liège–Bastogne–Liège classic road cycling race.
 1 May — Rolf Sørensen wins the Eschborn-Frankfurt City Loop.
 July 3–25 —  1993 Tour de France
 8 July – Jesper Skibby wins the 5th stage.
 10 July — Bjarne Riis wins the 7th stage.
 July 25 — Bjarne Riis finishes in fifth place in the 1993 Tour de France.
 6 October — Rolf Sørensen wins the Milano–Torino road cycling race.
 Rolf Sørensen (DEN) and Jens Veggerby (DEN) win the Six Days of Copenhagen sox-day track cycling race.
 Unknown date Jens Veggerby wins gold in UCI Motor-paced at the 1993 UCI Track Cycling World Championships.

Football
 20 May  OB wins the 1992–93 Danish Cup by defeating AaB Fodbold 20 in the final.

Other
 12 February — Gert Bo Jacobsen becomes WBO welterweight champions in boxing.
 5 December — Denmark wins silver the 1993 World Women's Handball Championship in Norway after being defeated 23–22 by Germany in the final.

Births
 14 April – Josephine Skriver, model
 14 May – Nicole Broch Larsen, golfer
 22 December – Hedvig Rasmussen, rower

Deaths
16 January - Robert Jacobsen, painter and sculptor (born 1903)
30 May - Henry Heerup, painter and sculptor (born 1907)
15 October – Dan Turèll, writer (born 1946)

See also
1993 in Danish television

References

 
Denmark
Years of the 20th century in Denmark
1990s in Denmark
Denmark